John Michael George "Jack" Lumsden (25 April 1927 – 22 October 2012) was a British modern pentathlete. He was the son of Lieutenant-General Herbert Lumsden and brother of Peter Lumsden. He competed at the 1948 Summer Olympics.

References

External links
 

1927 births
2012 deaths
British male modern pentathletes
Olympic modern pentathletes of Great Britain
Modern pentathletes at the 1948 Summer Olympics
People from Marylebone
Athletes from London